Ralph Cholmley (by 1517–63), of London, was an English politician.

He was a Member (MP) of the Parliament of England for Mitchell in 1547, Bodmin in March 1553 and for Boroughbridge April 1554 and for London in November 1554, 1555, 1558, 1559 and 1563.

References

Year of birth missing
1563 deaths
Politicians from London
Serjeants-at-law (England)
English MPs 1547–1552
English MPs 1553 (Edward VI)
English MPs 1554
English MPs 1554–1555
English MPs 1558
English MPs 1559
English MPs 1563–1567